Geoffrey Francis Andrew Best FBA (20 November 1928 – 14 January 2018) was an English historian known for his studies of warfare and works about Winston Churchill.

Early life and family
Geoffrey Best was born in Osterley, Middlesex, on 20 November 1928. He was educated at St Paul's School, London. He undertook his national service in the Royal Army Educational Corps teaching illiterate Scottish soldiers to read and write.

Best married Marigold Davies in 1955 and they had three children together. Marigold later became involved in Quakerism and the Campaign for Nuclear Disarmament (CND) and she and her husband went on CND marches together.

Career
Best studied at Trinity Hall, University of Cambridge, becoming a fellow from 1955 to 1961 and an assistant lecturer at Corpus Christi College, Cambridge, 1956 to 1961. From 1961 to 1974 he was lecturer, reader, and finally Sir Richard Lodge Professor of History at the University of Edinburgh. From 1974 to 1982 he was professor of history at the University of Sussex. He then spent six years as an academic visitor at the London School of Economics before in 1988 becoming a member of St Antony's College, University of Oxford. He was elected a fellow of the British Academy in 2003.

Writing
In 1974, Best became series editor of the Fontana History of European War and Society for which he wrote War and Society in Revolutionary Europe 1770-1870 (1982).

He wrote two books on Winston Churchill, Churchill: A Study in Greatness (2001) and Churchill and War (2005).

Death
Best died on 14 January 2018.

Selected publications

Authored
 Shaftesbury. Batsford, London, 1964.
 Temporal Pillars. Queen Anne's Bounty, the Ecclesiastical Commissioners, and the Church of England. Cambridge University Press, Cambridge, 1964.
 Bishop Westcott and the Miners. Syndics of the Cambridge University Press, London, 1967. (Bishop Westcott memorial lecture)
 History, Politics and Universities: Inaugural Lecture Delivered on Tuesday 4th March 1969. Edinburgh University Press, Edinburgh, 1969.
 Mid-Victorian Britain, 1851-1875. Weidenfeld & Nicolson, London, 1971. 
 Humanity in Warfare: the Modern History of the International Law of Armed Conflict. Weidenfeld & Nicolson, London, 1980. 
 Honour among Men and Nations: Transformations of an Idea. University of Toronto Press, Toronto, 1981. 
 War and Society in Revolutionary Europe 1770-1870. Leicester University Press, Leicester, 1982. 
 Nuremberg and After: The Continuing History of War Crimes and Crimes Against Humanity. University of Reading, Reading, 1984. (Stenton lecture)
 War and Law since 1945. Clarendon Press, Oxford, 1994. 
 Churchill: A Study in Greatness. Bloomsbury, London, 2001. 
 Churchill and War. Hambledon Continuum, 2005. 
 A Life of Learning: Selective Memoirs of Geoffrey Best. Matador, Kibworth Beauchamp, 2010.

Edited
 Church, R.W. The Oxford Movement: Twelve Years, 1833-1845. University of Chicago Press, Chicago, 1970. (Edited and introduced) 
 War, Economy and the Military Mind. Croom Helm, London, 1976. (With Andrew Wheatcroft)
 History, Society and the Churches: Essays in Honour of Owen Chadwick. Cambridge University Press, Cambridge, 1985. (with Derek Beales)
 The Permanent Revolution: The French Revolution and its Legacy, 1789-1989. University of Chicago Press, Chicago, 1988.

References 

1928 births
2018 deaths
20th-century English historians
21st-century English historians
21st-century English memoirists
Fellows of the British Academy
Academics of the University of Sussex
People from Osterley
Royal Army Educational Corps soldiers
People educated at St Paul's School, London
Academics of the University of Edinburgh
Fellows of Trinity Hall, Cambridge
Alumni of Trinity College, Cambridge
Academics of the University of Oxford
Historians of warfare
English biographers